Ethir Kaatru is a 1990 Indian Tamil-language thriller film, directed by Muktha S. Sundar and produced by Muktha Srinivasan. The film stars Karthik and Kanaka. It was released on 7 December 1990. The film is based on the Malayalam film Artham, which is in turn based on the Tamil novel Ethir Kaatru, written by Subha.

Plot

Ram Narendran (Karthik), a rich orphan youth, decides to put an end to his life. Waiting in the railway track, he sees another man there who tries to jump on the railway track and Ram Narendran saves him. This person is Jana (Anand Babu), he lives with his parents (Ra. Sankaran and M. N. Rajam) and his little sister Geetha (Chithra). Jana was a jobless youth and he got a job as a manager in a chit fund company with Madhavan's help (a family friend) and paid a big amount to join the company. Later, the company ripped off his clients: Madhavan cheated him. The clients threatened the innocent Jana and they put pressure on him to pay back them. Angry, Jana killed Madhavan, so he decides to commit suicide.

Ram Narendran decides to surrender instead of him and goes to the jail happily. Jana has a guilty conscience and he appoints S. Chandrasekaran (V. K. Ramasamy), a lawyer, to bail Narendran out of jail. However, Narendran would rather sacrifice his life without goals than Jana's life. Later, Jana meets Devaraj (Anandaraj), the chit fund company's head, and his partners: Maasi (Livingston), a politician's cousin, and a police officer's son (Crazy Venkatesh). Jana challenges Devaraj to punish them. The next day, Jana's dead body is found on a railway track.

S. Chandrasekaran then publishes Ram Narendran's book and it turns out to be a huge success. Anita (Kanaka), a journalist, tries to meet him. Anita and S. Chandrasekaran bail Ram Narendran out of jail. Ram Narendran cannot accept that Jana committed suicide, so Anita and Ram Narendran start to investigate Jana's mysterious death.

Cast

Karthik as Ram Narendran
Kanaka as Journalist Anita
Anand Babu as Jana (Janardan)
V. K. Ramasamy as Advocate S. Chandrasekaran
Chithra as Geetha, Jana's sister
Anandaraj as Devaraj, Owner of Chit Fund Company
Livingston as Maasi, Brother in law of a minister
Crazy Venkatesh as son of DSP and an acquaintance of Maasi and Devaraj
Manorama as the landlady of S. Chandrasekaran
Ra. Sankaran as Jana's father
M. N. Rajam as Jana's mother
Vathiyar Raman as Francis
Vennira Aadai Moorthy
V. Gopalakrishnan
Oru Viral Krishna Rao
Santhana Bharathi as Minister Azhagesan
Delhi Ganesh as Sundaramoorthy, Anita's editor
LIC Narasimhan
K. Natraj as Anita's Newspaper company owner
 Writer S. Ramakrishnan in one scene.

Soundtrack
The music was composed by Ilaiyaraaja, with lyrics written by himself and Vaali.

References

External links 
 
 

1990 films
1990s Tamil-language films
Films scored by Ilaiyaraaja
Tamil remakes of Malayalam films